The 2020–21 Cypriot First Division Women is the twenty-fourth season if the top-flight women's football league in Cyprus. Apollon Ladies F.C. are the defending champions.

The season began on 13 September 2020.

Teams 

 Apollon Ladies F.C.
 Nea Salamina Famagusta
 Omonia Nicosia
 Lefkothea Nicosia
 Ypsona Limassol
 Karmiotissa Chrysomilia
 Geroskipou F.C. Ladies
 Ethnikos Achnas Ladies F.C.
 Ermis Apollon

League table

References 

2020–21 domestic women's association football leagues
2020–21 in Cypriot football